The ruins of Thüngfelderstein Castle, also called Eberhardstein Castle (Burg Eberhardstein), are the burgstall of a demolished hill castle on a block of rock near Morschreuth in the south German state of Bavaria. The site lies within the market municipality of Gößweinstein in the county of Forchheim.

The castle was built in the 12th century by the lords of Thüngfeld; in 1154, for example, an Eberjard von Thüngfeld is mentioned.

Of the former tower castle only a moat has survived.

Literature 
 Walter Heinz: Ehemalige Adelssitze im Trubachtal - Ein Wegweiser für Heimatfreunde und Wanderer. Verlag Palm und Enke, Erlangen and Jena, 1996, pp. 226–231.
 Hellmut Kunstmann: Die Burgen der südwestlichen Fränkischen Schweiz. From the series: Veröffentlichungen der Gesellschaft für Fränkische Geschichte Reihe IX: Darstellungen aus der Fränkischen Geschichte, Vol. 28. Kommissionsverlag Degener und Co., Neustadt/Aisch 1990, pp. 261–262.

External links 
 

 

Castles in Bavaria
Hill castles
Forchheim (district)
Gößweinstein